Gymnobela oculifera is a species of sea snail, a marine gastropod mollusk in the family Raphitomidae.

Description

Distribution
This marine species was found in the Northwest Pacific Ridge.

References

External links
 

oculifera
Gastropods described in 1986